M'bour Department is one of the 45 departments of Senegal, one of three in the Thiès Region. Its capital is M'Bour.

The department has 8 urban communes; Joal-Fadiouth, Mbour, Nguékhokh, Thiadiaye, Saly Portudal, Ngaparou, Somone and Popenguine. Since 2018, the department will be creating its first Planned urban city, named Akon City or in French, Ville d'Akon.

The rural districts (communautés rurales) are:
Arrondissement of Fissel:
 Fissel
 Ndiaganiao
Arrondissement of Séssène:
 Séssène
 Nguéniène
Arrondissement de Sindia:
 Sindia
 Malicounda
 Diass

Historic sites 
 Residence at Popenguine and the Cap de Naze
 Tumuli of the forest of Bandia
 Church and Sanctuary of Popenguine
 Fadiouth Island, Cemetery Island and Granaries on stilts
 Fort of the Comptoir of Saly Portudal
 Thiémassas prehistoric site 
 Little Seminary of Ngazobil
 Senghor family house at Joal
 Ndianda church
 Sangomar, place of the Sereer cult, at Palmarin
 Fangool and cannon at Mbalamson
 Sereer Tumulus of Mbafaye at Godaguène Fissel

References

Departments of Senegal
Thiès Region